Ennepe-Ruhr-Kreis II is an electoral constituency (German: Wahlkreis) represented in the Bundestag. It elects one member via first-past-the-post voting. Under the current constituency numbering system, it is designated as constituency 139. It is located in the Ruhr region of North Rhine-Westphalia, comprising the northern part of the Ennepe-Ruhr-Kreis district.

Ennepe-Ruhr-Kreis II was created for the inaugural 1949 federal election. Since 2021, it has been represented by Axel Echeverria of the Social Democratic Party (SPD).

Geography
Ennepe-Ruhr-Kreis II is located in the Ruhr region of North Rhine-Westphalia. As of the 2021 federal election, it comprises the municipalities of Hattingen, Herdecke, Sprockhövel, Wetter (Ruhr), and Witten from the Ennepe-Ruhr-Kreis district.

History
Ennepe-Ruhr-Kreis II was created in 1949, then known as Ennepe-Ruhr – Witten. From 1965 through 1976, it was named Ennepe-Ruhr-Kreis. From 1980 through 1998, it was named Ennepe-Ruhr-Kreis I. It acquired its current name in the 2002 election. In the 1949 election, it was North Rhine-Westphalia constituency 54 in the numbering system. From 1953 through 1961, it was number 113. From 1965 through 1976, it was number 112. From 1980 through 1998, it was number 109. From 2002 through 2009, it was number 140. Since 2013, it has been number 139.

Originally, the constituency comprised the Ennepe-Ruhr-Kreis district and the independent city of Witten. From 1965 through 1976, it was coterminous with the Ennepe-Ruhr-Kreis district. From 1980 through 1998, it comprised the entirety of the Ennepe-Ruhr-Kreis district excluding Witten. It acquired its current borders in the 2002 election.

Members
The constituency has been held continuously by the Social Democratic Party (SPD) since its creation. It was first represented by Walter Freitag 1949 to 1953, followed by Heinrich Sträter until 1961. Wilhelm Michels was elected in 1961 and served until 1972. He was succeeded by Hans-Jürgen Augstein, who served two terms. Eugen von der Wiesche was then representative from 1980 to 1990. Adolf Ostertag served until 2002, followed by Christel Humme from 2002 to 2013. Ralf Kapschack was elected in 2013 and re-elected in 2017. He was succeeded by Axel Echeverria in 2021.

Election results

2021 election

2017 election

2013 election

2009 election

Notes

References

Federal electoral districts in North Rhine-Westphalia
1949 establishments in West Germany
Constituencies established in 1949
Ennepe-Ruhr-Kreis